The 2003 Campionati Internazionali di Sicilia was a men's tennis tournament played on outdoor clay courts in Palermo, Italy and was part of the International Series of the 2003 ATP Tour. It was the 25th edition of the tournament and was held from 22 September until 28 September 2003. First-seeded Nicolás Massú won the singles title.

Finals

Singles

 Nicolás Massú defeated  Paul-Henri Mathieu 1–6, 6–2, 7–6(7–0)
 It was Massú's 2nd singles title of the year and the 3rd of his career.

Doubles

 Lucas Arnold /  Mariano Hood defeated  František Čermák /  Leoš Friedl 7–6(8–6), 6–7(3–7), 6–3
 It was Arnold's 2nd title of the year and the 11th of his career. It was Hood's 4th title of the year and the 8th of his career.

References

External links
 ITF tournament edition details

Campionati Internazionali di Sicilia
Campionati Internazionali di Sicilia
Campionati Internazionali di Sicilia
Campionati Internazionali di Sicilia